Criorhina asilica, is a species of hoverfly. It is found in many parts of Britain and Europe.

The larvae of C. asilica are associated with rotting deciduous wood in mature woodland and fens. Adults are Honey Bee mimics and can be found in spring visiting hawthorn flowers.

References

Diptera of Europe
Eristalinae
Insects described in 1816
Taxa named by Carl Fredrik Fallén